Jean-René Cazeneuve (born 9 June 1958) is a French politician of La République En Marche!  (LREM) who has been serving as a member of the French National Assembly since 18 June 2017, representing the department of Gers.

Early career
From 2001 to 2004, Cazeneuve was the Managing Director of Apple Inc. for France, Central Europe, Middle East and Africa.

Political career
Cazeneuve first became a member of the National Assembly in the 2017 elections. In parliament, he has since been serving on the Committee on Finance. Since 2022, he has been serving as the Parliament's lead rapporteur on the annual budget of France.

See also
 2017 French legislative election

References

1958 births
Living people
Deputies of the 15th National Assembly of the French Fifth Republic
La République En Marche! politicians
Politicians from Occitania (administrative region)
Politicians from Paris
Deputies of the 16th National Assembly of the French Fifth Republic